Mingyan Liu is an electrical engineering and computer science professor, and the Peter and Evelyn Fuss Chair of Electrical and Computer Engineering at the University of Michigan, Ann Arbor, MI. Her research is in optimal resource allocation, sequential decision theory, incentive design, online learning, and modeling and mining of large scale Internet measurement data concerning cyber security. She was a co-founder of the cybersecurity scoring startup Quadmetrics in 2014. Quadmetrics was named a "2016 Cool Vendor in Risk Management" by Gartner, and was acquired by FICO in 2016.

Awards 
Liu was named a Fellow of the Institute of Electrical and Electronics Engineers (IEEE) in 2014 for contributions to modeling of wireless ad-hoc and sensor networks.

In 2016, Liu received the "Crossing the Valley of Death" PI Excellence Award, from the Department of Homeland Security - Cyber Security Division.

She was named the 2018 Distinguished University Innovator at the University of Michigan for her work in the field of cybersecurity.

She has also received a number of other research, teaching, and service awards, including the 2002 NSF CAREER Award, the University of Michigan Elizabeth C. Crosby Research Award in 2003 and 2014, the EECS Department Outstanding Achievement Award in 2011, the College of Engineering Excellence in Education Award in 2015, the College of Engineering Excellence in Service Award in 2017, and the ECE Distinguished Alumni Award from the Electrical & Computer Engineering Department, University of Maryland, in 2017.

References 

Fellow Members of the IEEE
Living people
University of Michigan faculty
Year of birth missing (living people)
American electrical engineers